Normunds Sējējs (born February 16, 1968 in Riga) is a former Latvian ice hockey defenceman and coach.

Sējējs was the general manager of Dinamo Riga in the Kontinental Hockey League.

His twin sons Nauris and Nils are also professional hockey players.

Playing career

Dinamo Riga (1987-1994)
Sējējs began his professional ice hockey player career in 1987, when he helped his team Dinamo Riga to win the Soviet Championship League silver medal. Normunds played for Dinamo until the end of 1990-91, but in 1991-92 he continued to play for Stars Riga, which was a direct successor of Dinamo. In 1992 the club was renamed once again to HK Pardaugava Riga, but it continued to play in International Hockey League. Normunds played for the club also in 1993-94, but as the club faced some financial difficulties and was not capable of paying wages on time, the Latvian defenceman began searching for career opportunities outside Latvia.

Career statistics

References

1968 births
Living people
Dinamo Riga players
ECH Chur players
Essen Mosquitoes players
HC Karlovy Vary players
HC Litvínov players
HC Slovan Bratislava players
HK Dukla Trenčín players
HK Riga 2000 players
KooKoo players
Latvian ice hockey coaches
Latvian ice hockey defencemen
Ice hockey people from Riga
Latvian sports coaches
Soviet ice hockey defencemen
Latvian expatriate sportspeople in Finland
Latvian expatriate sportspeople in the Czech Republic
Latvian expatriate sportspeople in Germany
Latvian expatriate sportspeople in Switzerland
Latvian expatriate sportspeople in Slovakia
Latvian expatriate ice hockey people
Expatriate ice hockey players in Switzerland
Expatriate ice hockey players in the Czech Republic
Expatriate ice hockey players in Slovakia
Expatriate ice hockey players in Finland
Expatriate ice hockey players in Germany